Aubrey Babas (formerly Sean Babas) is a commercial, music video, and motion picture film director.

Biography
Aubrey Babas is a transgender Ukrainian immigrant, American film producer and writer. She was born on February 6, 1992, to Ukrainian parents and adopted out of Moscow, Russia, from an orphanage at the age of two. She was raised in the suburbs of Troy, Michigan, by her adoptive parents, Maureen and Robert Babas. Maureen Babas, a licensed pilot, R.N. and attorney died after a three-year battle with cancer when Aubrey was only nine years old. Her father, Robert Babas, retired as a lieutenant colonel after receiving the Purple Heart and worked for Unisys Corp. for nearly four decades.

By the time Aubrey graduated high school, her work had already been played on network television and screened at national film festivals. After attending Columbia for one semester, she moved to California to continue her work as a film director.

Aubrey worked with record labels and recording artists including Young Money (YMCMB), Twista, Christina Grimmie, Big Sean, Yung Joc, Royce Da 5'9, Dallas Lovato, and more. The transgender Ukrainian immigrant established herself as a national music video and commercial director, having also done spots for Monster Energy, Doritos and Chevrolet's Camaro.

In 2011, Aubrey worked with Brian Teefey, step-father of Selena Gomez, to direct Christina Grimmie's debut music video for "Advice" under his company, LH7 Management.

In 2015 and at the age of 23, Aubrey used her earnings from the film industry to complete the transition from her birth gender.

Present day
In 2022, Aubrey returned to the film industry and opened up her own video production company, LumiVision Entertainment.

Awards
 Directed 2 of the top 18 music videos of 2011 named by TuneLab 
 Westfall "Industrial Rodent"
 Otto Vector "Charlie Mix"
 Directed 1 of 5 music videos screened at 2010 Florida Music Festival
 Directed #1 music video on MTV - KDrew - "One"

References

External links

Living people
1992 births
Music video directors